Shahrestanak (also Romanized as Shahrestānak; also known as Sahr Satāna and Shakhrisdana) is a village in Khararud Rural District, in the Central District of Khodabandeh County, Zanjan Province, Iran. At the 2006 census, its population was 116, in 28 families.

References 

Populated places in Khodabandeh County